Stone Cold Dead is a 1979 Canadian film directed by George Mendeluk and starring Richard Crenna and Paul Williams.

Premise
A Toronto detective (Richard Crenna) searches for a serial killer who shoots prostitutes. The detective is also determined to arrest the pushy pimps, and a few undercover cops get killed as they try to infiltrate the hooker trade.

Cast

Production 
Crenna said he was drawn to the film partly because his character survives the events of the plot, something that few of his characters had done recently.  Mendeluk used both actresses and real-life Toronto prostitutes during filming.  Shooting took place during November and December 1978 in Toronto, and production ended in February 1979.  It was based on the novel The Sin Sniper by Hugh Garner.

Reception 
TV Guide rated it 1/5 stars and called it a "typical crime thriller".

Crenna later said that he thought the content was not Canadian-specific enough.

References

External links 
 
 
 

1979 films
Canadian crime drama films
Dimension Pictures films
English-language Canadian films
Films scored by Paul Zaza
1979 directorial debut films
1970s English-language films
Films directed by George Mendeluk
1970s Canadian films